Landslides, also known as landslips, are several forms of mass wasting that may include a wide range of ground movements, such as rockfalls, shallow or deep-seated slope failures, mudflows, and debris flows. Landslides occur in a variety of environments, characterized by either steep or gentle slope gradients, from mountain ranges to coastal cliffs or even underwater, in which case they are called submarine landslides. 

Gravity is the primary driving force for a landslide to occur, but there are other factors affecting slope stability that produce specific conditions that make a slope prone to failure. In many cases, the landslide is triggered by a specific event (such as a heavy rainfall, an earthquake, a slope cut to build a road, and many others), although this is not always identifiable.

Landslides are frequently made worse by human development (such as urban sprawl) and resource exploitation (such as mining and deforestation). Land degradation  frequently leads to  less stabilization of soil by vegetation. Additionally, global Warming caused by climate change and other human impact on the environment, can increase the frequency of natural events (such as extreme weather) which trigger landslides. Landslide mitigation describes the policy and practices for reducing the risk of human impacts of landslides, reducing the risk of natural disaster.

Causes

Landslides occur when the slope (or a portion of it) undergoes some processes that change its condition from stable to unstable. This is essentially due to a decrease in the shear strength of the slope material, an increase in the shear stress borne by the material, or a combination of the two. A change in the stability of a slope can be caused by a number of factors, acting together or alone. Natural causes of landslides include:
 saturation by rain water infiltration, snow melting, or glaciers melting;
rising of groundwater or increase of pore water pressure (e.g. due to aquifer recharge in rainy seasons, or by rain water infiltration);
increase of hydrostatic pressure in cracks and fractures;
 loss or absence of vertical vegetative structure, soil nutrients, and soil structure (e.g. after a wildfire – a fire in forests lasting for 3–4 days);
erosion of the top of a slope by rivers or sea waves;
physical and chemical weathering (e.g. by repeated freezing and thawing, heating and cooling, salt leaking in the groundwater or mineral dissolution);
 ground shaking caused by earthquakes, which can destabilize the slope directly (e.g., by inducing soil liquefaction) or weaken the material and cause cracks that will eventually produce a landslide;
 volcanic eruptions;

Landslides are aggravated by human activities, such as:
 deforestation, cultivation and construction;
 vibrations from machinery or traffic;
 blasting and mining;
 earthwork (e.g. by altering the shape of a slope, or imposing new loads);
 in shallow soils, the removal of deep-rooted vegetation that binds colluvium to bedrock;
 agricultural or forestry activities (logging), and urbanization, which change the amount of water infiltrating the soil.

temporal variation in land use and land cover (LULC): it includes the human abandonment of farming areas, e.g. due to the economic and social transformations which occurred in Europe after the Second World War. Land degradation and extreme rainfall can increase the frequency of erosion and landslide phenomena.

Types

Hungr-Leroueil-Picarelli classification

In traditional usage, the term landslide has at one time or another been used to cover almost all forms of mass movement of rocks and regolith at the Earth's surface. In 1978, geologist David Varnes noted this imprecise usage and proposed a new, much tighter scheme for the classification of mass movements and subsidence processes. This scheme was later modified by Cruden and Varnes in 1996, and refined by Hutchinson (1988), Hungr et al. (2001), and finally by Hungr, Leroueil and Picarelli (2014). The classification resulting from the latest update is provided below.

Under this classification, six types of movement are recognized. Each type can be seen both in rock and in soil. A fall is a movement of isolated blocks or chunks of soil in free-fall. The term topple refers to blocks coming away by rotation from a vertical face. A slide is the movement of a body of material that generally remains intact while moving over one or several inclined surfaces or thin layers of material (also called shear zones) in which large deformations are concentrated. Slides are also sub-classified by the form of the surface(s) or shear zone(s) on which movement happens. The planes may be broadly parallel to the surface ("planar slides") or spoon-shaped ("rotational slides"). Slides can occur catastrophically, but movement on the surface can also be gradual and progressive. Spreads are a form of subsidence, in which a layer of material cracks, opens up, and expands laterally. Flows are the movement of fluidised material, which can be both dry or rich in water (such as in mud flows). Flows can move imperceptibly for years, or accelerate rapidly and cause disasters. Slope deformations are slow, distributed movements that can affect entire mountain slopes or portions of it. Some landslides are complex in the sense that they feature different movement types in different portions of the moving body, or they evolve from one movement type to another over time. For example, a landslide can initiate as a rock fall or topple and then, as the blocks disintegrate upon the impact, transform into a debris slide or flow. An avalanching effect can also be present, in which the moving mass entrains additional material along its path.

Flows
Slope material that becomes saturated with water may produce a debris flow or mud flow. However, also dry debris can exhibit flow-like movement. Flowing debris or mud may pick up trees, houses and cars, and block bridges and rivers causing flooding along its path. This phenomenon is particularly hazardous in alpine areas, where narrow gorges and steep valleys are conducive of faster flows. Debris and mud flows may initiate on the slopes or result from the fluidization of landslide material as it gains speed or incorporates further debris and water along its path. River blockages as the flow reaches a main stream can generate temporary dams. As the impoundments fail, a domino effect may be created, with a remarkable growth in the volume of the flowing mass, and in its destructive power.

An earthflow is the downslope movement of mostly fine-grained material. Earthflows can move at speeds within a very wide range, from as low as 1 mm/yr to many km/h. Though these are a lot like mudflows, overall they are more slow-moving and are covered with solid material carried along by the flow from within. Clay, fine sand and silt, and fine-grained, pyroclastic material are all susceptible to earthflows. These flows are usually controlled by the pore water pressures within the mass, which should be high enough to produce a low shearing resistance. On the slopes, some earthflow may be recognized by their elongated shape, with one or more lobes at their toes. As these lobes spread out, drainage of the mass increases and the margins dry out, lowering the overall velocity of the flow. This process also causes the flow to thicken. Earthflows occur more often during periods of high precipitation, which saturates the ground and builds up water pressures. However, earthflows that keep advancing also during dry seasons are not uncommon. Fissures may develop during the movement of clayey materials, which facilitate the intrusion of water into the moving mass and produce faster responses to precipitation.

A rock avalanche, sometimes referred to as sturzstrom, is a large and fast-moving landslide of the flow type. It is rarer than other types of landslides but it is often very destructive. It exhibits typically a long runout, flowing very far over a low-angle, flat, or even slightly uphill terrain. The mechanisms favoring the long runout can be different, but they typically result in the weakening of the sliding mass as the speed increases. The causes of this weakening are not completely understood. Especially for the largest landslides, it may involve the very quick heating of the shear zone due to friction, which may even cause the water that is present to vaporize and build up a large pressure, producing a sort of hovercraft effect. In some cases, the very high temperature may even cause some of the minerals to melt. During the movement, the rock in the shear zone may also be finely ground, producing a nanometer-size mineral powder that may act as a lubricant, reducing the resistance to motion and promoting larger speeds and longer runouts. The weakening mechanisms in large rock avalanches are similar to those occurring in seismic faults.

Slides 
Slides can occur in any rock or soil material and are characterized by the movement of a mass over a planar or curvilinear surface or shear zone. 

A debris slide is a type of slide characterized by the chaotic movement of material mixed with water and/or ice. It is usually triggered by the saturation of thickly vegetated slopes which results in an incoherent mixture of broken timber, smaller vegetation and other debris. Debris flows and avalanches differ from debris slides because their movement is fluid-like and generally much more rapid. This is usually a result of lower shear resistances and steeper slopes. Debris slides generally begin with the detachment of rock chunks high on the slopes, which break apart as they slide towards the bottom. 

Clay and silt slides are usually slow but can experience episodic acceleration in response to heavy rainfall or rapid snowmelt. They are often seen on gentle slopes and move over planar surfaces, such as over the underlying bedrock. Failure surfaces can also form within the clay or silt layer itself, and they usually have concave shapes, resulting in rotational slides

Shallow and deep-seated landslides

A landslide in which the sliding surface is located within the soil mantle or weathered bedrock (typically to a depth from few decimeters to some meters) is called a shallow landslide. Debris slides and debris flows are usually shallow. Shallow landslides can often happen in areas that have slopes with high permeable soils on top of low permeable soils. The low permeable soil traps the water in the shallower soil generating high water pressures. As the top soil is filled with water, it can become unstable and slide downslope.

Deep-seated landslides are those in which the sliding surface is mostly deeply located, for instance well below the maximum rooting depth of trees. They usually involve deep regolith, weathered rock, and/or bedrock and include large slope failures associated with translational, rotational, or complex movements. They tend to form along a plane of weakness such as a fault or bedding plane. They can be visually identified by concave scarps at the top and steep areas at the toe. Deep-seated landslides also shape landscapes over geological timescales and produce sediment that strongly alters the course of fluvial streams.

Related phenomena
 An avalanche, similar in mechanism to a landslide, involves a large amount of ice, snow and rock falling quickly down the side of a mountain.
 A pyroclastic flow is caused by a collapsing cloud of hot ash, gas and rocks from a volcanic explosion that moves rapidly down an erupting volcano.
 Extreme precipitation and flow can cause gully formation in flatter environments not susceptible to landslides.

Resulting tsunamis 

Landslides that occur undersea, or have impact into water e.g. significant rockfall or volcanic collapse into the sea, can generate tsunamis. Massive landslides can also generate megatsunamis, which are usually hundreds of meters high. In 1958, one such tsunami occurred in Lituya Bay in Alaska.

Landslide prediction mapping

Landslide hazard analysis and mapping can provide useful information for catastrophic loss reduction, and assist in the development of guidelines for sustainable land-use planning. The analysis is used to identify the factors that are related to landslides, estimate the relative contribution of factors causing slope failures, establish a relation between the factors and landslides, and to predict the landslide hazard in the future based on such a relationship. The factors that have been used for landslide hazard analysis can usually be grouped into geomorphology, geology, land use/land cover, and hydrogeology. Since many factors are considered for landslide hazard mapping, GIS is an appropriate tool because it has functions of collection, storage, manipulation, display, and analysis of large amounts of spatially referenced data which can be handled fast and effectively. Cardenas reported evidence on the exhaustive use of GIS in conjunction of uncertainty modelling tools for landslide mapping. Remote sensing techniques are also highly employed for landslide hazard assessment and analysis. Before and after aerial photographs and satellite imagery are used to gather landslide characteristics, like distribution and classification, and factors like slope, lithology, and land use/land cover to be used to help predict future events. Before and after imagery also helps to reveal how the landscape changed after an event, what may have triggered the landslide, and shows the process of regeneration and recovery.

Using satellite imagery in combination with GIS and on-the-ground studies, it is possible to generate maps of likely occurrences of future landslides. Such maps should show the locations of previous events as well as clearly indicate the probable locations of future events. In general, to predict landslides, one must assume that their occurrence is determined by certain geologic factors, and that future landslides will occur under the same conditions as past events. Therefore, it is necessary to establish a relationship between the geomorphologic conditions in which the past events took place and the expected future conditions.

Natural disasters are a dramatic example of people living in conflict with the environment. Early predictions and warnings are essential for the reduction of property damage and loss of life. Because landslides occur frequently and can represent some of the most destructive forces on earth, it is imperative to have a good understanding as to what causes them and how people can either help prevent them from occurring or simply avoid them when they do occur. Sustainable land management and development is also an essential key to reducing the negative impacts felt by landslides.

GIS offers a superior method for landslide analysis because it allows one to capture, store, manipulate, analyze, and display large amounts of data quickly and effectively. Because so many variables are involved, it is important to be able to overlay the many layers of data to develop a full and accurate portrayal of what is taking place on the Earth's surface. Researchers need to know which variables are the most important factors that trigger landslides in any given location. Using GIS, extremely detailed maps can be generated to show past events and likely future events which have the potential to save lives, property, and money.

Since the ‘90s, GIS have been also successfully used in conjunction to decision support systems, to show on a map real-time risk evaluations based on monitoring data gathered in the area of the Val Pola disaster (Italy).

Prehistoric landslides

 Storegga Slide, some 8,000 years ago off the western coast of Norway. Caused massive tsunamis in Doggerland and other areas connected to the North Sea. The landslide is thought to be among the largest in history.
 Landslide which moved Heart Mountain to its current location, the largest continental landslide discovered so far. In the 48 million years since the slide occurred, erosion has removed most of the portion of the slide.
 The Manang-Braga rock avalanche/debris flow may have formed Marsyangdi Valley in the Annapurna Region, Nepal, during an interstadial period belonging to the last glacial period. Over 15 km3 of material are estimated to have been moved in the single event, making it one of the largest continental landslides.
 Tsergo Ri landslide, a massive slope failure 60 km north of Kathmandu, Nepal, involving an estimated 10–15 km3. Prior to this landslide the mountain may have been the world's 15th mountain above 8000m.

Historical landslides

 The 1806 Goldau landslide on September 2, 1806
 The Cap Diamant Québec rockslide on September 19, 1889
 Frank Slide, Turtle Mountain, Alberta, Canada, on 29 April 1903
 Khait landslide, Khait, Tajikistan, Soviet Union, on July 10, 1949
 A magnitude 7.5 earthquake in Yellowstone Park (August 17, 1959) caused a landslide that blocked the Madison River, and created Quake Lake.
 Monte Toc landslide falling into the Vajont Dam basin in Italy, causing a megatsunami and about 2000 deaths, on October 9, 1963
 Hope Slide landslide near Hope, British Columbia on January 9, 1965.
 The 1966 Aberfan disaster
 Tuve landslide in Gothenburg, Sweden on November 30, 1977.
 The 1979 Abbotsford landslip, Dunedin, New Zealand on August 8, 1979.
 The eruption of Mount St. Helens (May 18, 1980) caused an enormous landslide when the top 1300 feet of the volcano suddenly gave way.
 Val Pola landslide during Valtellina disaster (1987) Italy
 Thredbo landslide, Australia on 30 July 1997, destroyed hostel.
 Vargas mudslides, due to heavy rains in Vargas State, Venezuela, in December, 1999, causing tens of thousands of deaths.
 2005 La Conchita landslide in Ventura, California causing 10 deaths.
 2007 Chittagong mudslide, in Chittagong, Bangladesh, on June 11, 2007.
 2008 Cairo landslide on September 6, 2008.
 The 2009 Peloritani Mountains disaster caused 37 deaths, on October 1.
 The 2010 Uganda landslide caused over 100 deaths following heavy rain in Bududa region.
 Zhouqu county mudslide in Gansu, China on August 8, 2010.
 Devil's Slide, an ongoing landslide in San Mateo County, California
 2011 Rio de Janeiro landslide in Rio de Janeiro, Brazil on January 11, 2011, causing 610 deaths.
 2014 Pune landslide, in Pune, India.
 2014 Oso mudslide, in Oso, Washington
 2017 Mocoa landslide, in Mocoa, Colombia
 2022 Ischia landslide

Extraterrestrial landslides
Evidence of past landslides has been detected on many bodies in the solar system, but since most observations are made by probes that only observe for a limited time and most bodies in the solar system appear to be geologically inactive not many landslides are known to have happened in recent times. Both Venus and Mars have been subject to long-term mapping by orbiting satellites, and examples of landslides have been observed on both planets.

Landslide mitigation

See also 

 Avalanche
 California landslides
 Deformation monitoring
 Earthquake engineering
 Geotechnical engineering
 Huayco
 Landslide dam
 Natural disaster
 Railway slide fence
 Rockslide
 Slump (geology)
 Washaway
 Urban search and rescue

References

External links

 United States Geological Survey site (archived 25 March 2002)
 British Geological Survey landslides site
 British Geological Survey National Landslide Database
 International Consortium on Landslides

 
Environmental soil science
Hazards of outdoor recreation
Natural disasters

no:Skred